Rabbi Dr. Baruch (Bernard) Aaron Poupko,  (February 5, 1917 – April 14, 2010) born in Velizh, Russia, (a town north of Mogilev) to Rabbi Eliezer and Pesha Poupko, was an American scholar, author, and lecturer.

After receiving ordination from Joseph Soloveitchik at the Rabbi Isaac Elchanan Theological Seminary in 1941 he served as Rabbi and Senior Rabbi of Shaare Torah of Pittsburgh, PA (1942–2004), President of the Rabbinical Council of Pittsburgh (1949–1999) and was one of the founders of the Hillel Academy of Pittsburgh. He was one of the first Jewish leaders to advocate international efforts on behalf of Soviet Jews during the early 1950s, and wrote the award-winning Yiddish book In the Shadow of the Kremlin, as well as many articles about Soviet Jewry. His doctoral thesis, completed at the University of Pittsburgh, "traces the history and status of Jewish religious adult education, analyzing the various emphases in curriculum of the three major religious ideologies." (American Jewish Year Book Vol. 66 (1965) 281)

Poupko edited and co-edited 38 sermon volumes of the Rabbinical Council of America, including the scholarly Anglo-Hebrew volume Eidenu in memory of the founder and first president of Yeshiva University (YU), Dr. Bernard Revel, the volumes in honor of rabbis Yitzhak HaLevi Herzog and Joseph Soloveitchik, of the centennial of YU, and of Dr. Norman Lamm's 20th anniversary as President of YU.

Poupko served as the National Vice President of the Rabbinical Council of America and as the National President of the Religious Zionists of America. He lived in Seattle, WA with his daughter, Rivy Poupko Kletenik, and son-in-law, Moshe Kletenik. He is the grandfather of Chaim Poupko, senior rabbi of Congregation Ahavath Torah in Englewood New Jersey.

He died on April 14, 2010 in Seattle WA.

Career 

Rabbi Baruch A. "Bernard" Poupko spent most of his career focused on the situation of Soviet Jews. He himself was a refugee who fled persecution in Russia.

Work for Jewish culture 
Eliezer Poupko was the chief Rabbi in the community who was also an activist who sent the letters describing the conditions for the jews to the Rabbinic leaders in the United States and England. There are some soviet authorities that have intercepted the letters and arrested the elder Poupko and then convicted them following a trial in the year 1930. Although he was sentenced to two years of hard labour in Siberia, his sentence was reduced to house arrest with the help of the Joint Distribution Committee (JDC). Then there was the family’s escape to Latvia that was managed by Poupko’s mother. She planned the escape with the help of the rowboat on the Dvina river that is in the middle of the night.

The JDC also secured their passports and the family made their way eventually to Poland. After that in 1931, they came to the United States. Poupko was ordained at the Rabbi Isaac Elchanan Theological Seminary at the Yeshiva University in 1941. He studied history at Columbia University and also obtained his doctorate at the University of Pittsburgh in 1952. He arrived in Pittsburgh in the year 1942 visiting the Rabbi at the Shaare Torah which was then in the hill district that was followed by the death of the rabbi at the age of 45 years. Poupko has described Sivitz in the historical recordings as the “revered and venerated throughout the Jewish world” and also by adding that it was a challenge to replace him.

In his own words “ To me, it was a frightening thing to step in the boots of such a personality. … Here, I could fashion something not the way it was handed to me, but how I would like to see it.” According to him, the new generation is going to have new challenges and needs. Well, Poupko took on the challenge and made his mark in Pittsburgh. According to Edie who is the director of the holocaust center of the United Jewish Federation, Poupko visited the UJF leadership in late 1970 in order to create a living memorial for the holocaust victims.

The holocaust center was established in the year 1981 which predated the holocaust museum system by almost 13 years. Well, for most f the years Poupko remained active with the holocaust center commission and various subcommittees. Well, Poupko never forgot the jews in the soviet union who faced discrimination and who frequently provided at times of starvation with care packages from the JDC. Well, Poupko also pioneered and sent the letters to the rabbinate throughout the United States in order to enlist their support.

Well, making the campaign public, which he described in the recording, is going to be the key in order to produce mass results. He described “Everything which is done in the free world to arouse public opinion is of help. … If not for the programs, if not for the efforts of Jews in America and the U.K. (United Kingdom), we would not have had so many thousands of Jews come out of Russia. The Soviet Union is very sensitive about public opinion. When we do things that annoy them very much, it is occasionally productive.”

Well as a result of the campaign of the save soviet Jewry camp, there were 32000 jews who left the soviet union for Israel, and 50000 came to the united states on their own in 1973. Well, Poupko always felt very lucky as well as privileged to escape from this, according to his granddaughter, Gilah Kletenik from New york. He also led the first rabbinic delegation with the soviet union and also had the chance to travel there a dozen times. According to her granddaughter, the KGB always followed him. He also spoke in synagogues and then campaigned for the government for the Jewish religion or emigration. There were 1.5 million Jews that resettled in the two countries.

From the year 1949 to the year 1999, Poupko was the president of the rabbinical council of Pittsburgh and also co-founded the Hillel Academy of Pittsburgh. He also brought the streams of Judaism together in establishing the greater Pittsburgh rabbinic association in the 1980s. Poupko also identified with the liberal progressives in politics but that too aside from the voting. He was active in politics. And also did not endorse any candidates from the pulpit. Poupko was also determined to raise his children with the same values his parents instilled in him. In the recording, he also spoke of his mother’s insistence on education in the stream of arts. Also, his parents did not believe being Jewish meant dressing just friendly and they could conduct themselves like everyone else.

In his own words, “Everything which is done in the free world to arouse public opinion is of help. … If not for the programs, if not for the efforts of Jews in America and the U.K. (United Kingdom), we would not have had so many thousands of Jews come out of Russia. The Soviet Union is very sensitive about public opinion. … When we do things that annoy them very much, it is occasionally productive.”

Films and Television 
There was a half an hour documentary that was made on Rabbi Bernard Poupko as he exited through the doors of Shaare Torah. There he was a Rabbi from the year 1942 and retired in the year 1996. The documentary was named Murray Avenue: a community in transition. It was made in 1983 by Sheila Chamovitz, who is a filmmaker from Pittsburgh.

Sources 
"Poupko, Bernard." Encyclopaedia Judaica. Jerusalem: Keter, 1972.
Rosenstein, Neil. The Unbroken Chain. Lakewood, NJ: CIS, 1990. p. 294
American Jewish Year Book

References

American Modern Orthodox rabbis
2010 deaths
Jewish educators
Religious leaders from Pittsburgh
Rabbis from Pennsylvania
Rabbi Isaac Elchanan Theological Seminary semikhah recipients
People from Velizh
Orthodox rabbis from Russia
Year of birth missing
20th-century American rabbis
21st-century American rabbis